La Femme au perroquet (Woman with a Parrot) is an oil painting on canvas by French artist Gustave Courbet. It was the first nude by the artist to be accepted by the Paris Salon in 1866 after a previous entry in 1864 was rejected as indecent. It is in the collection of the Metropolitan Museum of Art in New York city.

Description
The painting shows a woman reclining on her back, with a pet parrot alighting on an outstretched hand. While painted in a style to gain Academy acceptance in its pose and smooth flesh tones, the model's discarded clothes and disheveled hair were controversial, although less so than Le Sommeil, painted the same year. Joanna Hiffernan likely posed for both paintings, as she did for others by Courbet.

The work is on view in the Metropolitan Museum's Gallery 811.

References

External links
Europe in the age of enlightenment and revolution, a catalog from The Metropolitan Museum of Art Libraries (fully available online as PDF), which contains material on ___ (see index)

Paintings by Gustave Courbet
1866 paintings
Paintings in the collection of the Metropolitan Museum of Art
Nude art
Birds in art